Saxons, known as Sasi, migrated to medieval Serbia in the mid-13th century from Hungary. Serbia's mines were developed by the community.

The earliest mention of Saxons in Serbia is from 1253–54, which shows them as an established community. These Saxons, or Sasi, had settled the Kingdom of Serbia during the reign of Stefan Uroš I (r. 1243–1276), from the Kingdom of Hungary. Under Stefan Uroš I, Serbia became a significant power in the Balkans, partly due to economic development through opening of mines. The mines were developed by the Sasi, who were experienced in the extracting of ore. Their settlements, located by the mines, had privileged status – they lived under their own laws and were allowed to adhere to Catholicism and build their churches.

Mines included Brskovo, Novo Brdo, and others.

Legacy
The villages of Šašare and Sase, Srebrenica, and the Saška reka was named after the community. 

Also, the settlement of Šaškovac near the town of Pristina in Kosovo is named after the Saxons. Mines as well as Novo Brdo were located in the immediate vicinity.

See also
Vlachs in medieval Serbia

References

Sources

Takács, Miklós. "Sächsische Bergleute im mittelalterlichen Serbien und die" sächsische Kirche" von Novo Brdo." Südost Forschungen 50 (1991): 31-60.
Katančević, Andreja. "Da li su Sasi imali privilegije u mešovitim sporovima u srednjovekovnoj Srbiji?." Anali Pravnog fakulteta u Beogradu-Časopis za pravne i društvene nauke 63.2 (2016).

Communities in medieval Serbia
Duchy of Saxony
Economy of Serbia in the Middle Ages
Mining in Serbia